The Third Division Football Tournament for the 2006 season in the Maldives. Red Line Club went on to win the tournament without losing a single game.

Group stage
Group A
Winner: Red Line Club
Runner up: Foundation for Kuda Henveiru

Group B
Winner: Club All Youth Linkage
Runner up: Club Campoa

Semi finals

Final

Awards

References

Maldivian Third Division Football Tournament seasons
3